Aristomenis (Menis) Koumandareas (4 January 1931 – 5 December 2014) was an acclaimed Greek writer.

Biography
Koumandareas attended classes in the Philosophy and Law schools of the University of Athens, as well as in a drama school, but he did not complete his studies in any of these fields. Instead, he worked for a while as a journalist, and then as a clerk in seafaring and insurance companies.

From 1961 forward until the time of his death Koumandareas was active as a writer and a translator. His texts have been published in many Greek literary periodicals. He was awarded the State Prize for Short Story (twice, 1967 and 1997) and for Novel (twice, 1975 and 2002).  from 1982 to 1986 he was a member of the board of directors for the Greek National Opera.

Koumandareas was found dead, a presumed murder victim, on 6 December 2014, in his apartment in Athens. He was 83. According to the coroner's report, he was strangled. Two Romanian men have been arrested as suspects, Ştefan Mătăsăreanu (25) and Cosmin Găitan (29). The first suspect, a long-time acquaintance of Koumandareas, was identified through descriptions from the author's last, autobiographical, novel.

Works

Prose
Τα μηχανάκια (Pin-ball Machines), 1962
Το αρμένισμα (The Saint), 1967
Τα καημένα (The Burnt Ones), 1972
Βιοτεχνία Υαλικών (Glass Factory), 1975
Η κυρία Κούλα (Koula, translated into English by Kaiē Tsitselē), 1978 
Το κουρείο (The Barber Shop), 1979
Σεραφείμ και Χερουβείμ (Seraphim and Cherubim), 1981
Ο ωραίος Λοχαγός (The Handsome Lieutenant), 1982
Η φανέλα με τό εννιά (Vest No 9), 1986
Πλανόδιος Σαλπιγκτής (The Wondering Trumpeter), 1989
Η συμμορία της Άρπας (The Harps's Gang), 1993
Θυμάμαι τη Μαρία (I remember Maria), 1994
Η μυρωδιά τους με κάνει να κλαίω (Their Smell Makes me Cry, translated into English by Patricia Felisa Barbeito and Vangelis Calotychos), 1996 
Η μέρα για τα γραπτά κι η νύχτα για το σώμα (Days Good for Writing and Nights Suit the Body), 1999
Δυο φορές Έλληνας (Twice a Greek), 2001
Νώε (Noah), 2003
Η γυναίκα που πετά (The Woman that Flies), 2006

Selected translations
Hesse, Hermann, Ντέμιαν (Demian), 1961
Mc Cullers, Carson, Η μπαλλάντα του λυπημένου καφενείου (The Ballad of the Sad Cafe), 1969
Faulkner, William, Καθώς ψυχορραγώ (As I Lay Dying), 1970
Carroll, Lewis, Η Αλίκη στη χώρα των θαυμάτων (Alice's Adventures in Wonderland), 1972
Büchner, Georg, Λεντς (Lenz), 1977
Melville, Herman, Μπάρτλεμπυ, ο γραφιάς κι άλλες ιστορίες (Bartleby, the Scrivener), 1980

References

External links
His entry for the 2001 Frankfurt Book Fair (Greek)
His page at Kedros Publishers
His page at the website of the Hellenic Authors' Society (Greek) and (English)

An interview (18 November 2007) (Greek)

1931 births
2014 deaths
Writers from Athens
National and Kapodistrian University of Athens alumni
20th-century Greek novelists
Greek essayists
Greek translators
People murdered in Greece
20th-century translators
20th-century essayists
Greek male novelists